The rufous-throated bronze cuckoo (Chrysococcyx ruficollis) is a species of cuckoo in the family Cuculidae.
It is found in the highlands of New Guinea.
Its natural habitat is tropical moist montane forests.

References

rufous-throated bronze cuckoo
Birds of New Guinea
rufous-throated bronze cuckoo
Taxonomy articles created by Polbot
Taxobox binomials not recognized by IUCN